Anthony Goodfellow (born 8 January 1940) is a former English first-class cricketer who played for Cambridge University from 1960 and 1962.

Tony Goodfellow attended Marlborough College before going up to Magdalene College, Cambridge. An opening and middle-order batsman, he gained his blue in 1961 and 1962. His highest score was 81 against Leicestershire in 1961, when he and Edward Craig put on 185 for the first wicket, and Cambridge went on to win by six wickets.

References

External links
 

1940 births
Living people
People educated at Marlborough College
Alumni of Magdalene College, Cambridge
English cricketers
Cambridge University cricketers